Writing to Remember is the first compilation album by Canadian Singer/Songwriter Matt Brouwer. The album was released on November 25, 2014 and features a collection of the 14 best loved songs from Brouwer's previous 4 studio albums. All the songs have been remastered and some re-mixed as well. The album includes one brand new single which appears as the first track on the project called, "Waking Up". Brouwer and Co. opted to include original college recordings of his songs, "Breathe" and "Lead" instead of the more polished versions that appear on his debut album, Imagerical. The exclusive single, "Waking Up, from the album was nominated for song of the year by the GMA Canada Covenant awards.

Track listing

References

2014 albums
Matt Brouwer albums